Ridgeway Academy,  formerly Sir Frederic Osborn School ("Sir Freds"), which itself was formed by the merging in 1968 of Attimore Hall School (secondary modern) and The High School (grammar school), is a secondary school in Welwyn Garden City, Hertfordshire, England. The school was built in the 1960s and is located in the Panshanger district of the town. In a 2015 Ofsted Report the school was rated "requires improvement" and received the same rating across all levels in a further inspection in 2017. The school was  named after Sir Frederic Osborn, a pioneer of the garden city movement. From September 2018 the school became an academy sponsored by the Alban Academies Trust (AAT) and was renamed the Ridgeway Academy with a new school uniform, badge and vision.

The school has a school council, where representatives from each year group attend regular meetings to decide what changes need to be made to school life to make the experience more beneficial to students and staff alike. These meetings are chaired by the Head Boy and Head Girl.

A building programme over the past few years has given the school new science, technology and vocational education blocks, as well as dance and drama studios.  The school has submitted and had a bid accepted to provide the school with a modern sports hall.

Welwyn Hatfield Consortium 
The school is part of the Welwyn Hatfield Consortium, which also includes:
Monk’s Walk School
Stanborough School
Bishop's Hatfield Girls' School
Onslow St Audrey's School

Notable former pupils
David James - Ex-England football goalkeeper.
Nick Faldo - Professional golfer.
Lisa Snowdon - Presenter and Fashion Model
Dean Richardson - Guitarist for Frank Carter & the Rattlesnakes
Caroline Deverill, West End actress

Gallery

References

External links 

School website

Schools in Welwyn Garden City
Secondary schools in Hertfordshire
Academies in Hertfordshire